Lukiškės Prison (or simply Łukiszki) was a prison in the center of Vilnius, Lithuania, near the Lukiškės Square.

Construction

Background 
Until the late 19th century the main form of punishment in Russian-held part of partitioned Poland was the katorga, or forced resettlement to a remote area to heavy labour camps or prison farms. This was true for both criminal and political prisoners alike. The Russian Penal Code of 1845 further strengthened the notion. Furthermore, prior to the Emancipation reform of 1861 the serfs, who constituted most of the society in contemporary Russian-held Europe, could be incarcerated by their master rather than in state-run prisons. Because of that, for most of the 19th century the small criminal prison at Vilna's suburb of Łukiszki (modern Lukiškės), converted from an earlier Roman Catholic monastery in 1837, was enough to suit the needs of the Russian authorities. Most prisoners spent only a short period in the prison before being either released, sent to the gallows or sent to distant regions of Russia for penal servitude.

However, the 1874 revision of the criminal code of Russia introduced two additional penalties: a short-term prison confinement (up to 1.5 years) and long-term prison confinement (up to 6 years). Meanwhile, the old prison became dilapidated and severely overcrowded. It was clear that a new prison complex was needed. Because of that in 1900 G.A. Trambitski, the official architect of the Main Prison Authority, was tasked with designing a modern, high-security prison complex. Instead of moving it out of the city, the tsarist authorities decided to demolish the old prison and build the new one in its place. One of the reasons for it was the site's proximity to the newly built Provincial Court building (today Museum of Occupations and Freedom Fights).

Design 
The project was inspired by Jeremy Bentham's idea of Panopticon, and was based on the design of Kresty Prison in Sankt Petersburg, which in turn was modelled after Moabit Prison in Berlin and the Holmesburg Prison and Eastern State Penitentiary in Philadelphia. In 1901 construction work began and the old prison was closed down and demolished. The works were supervised by General Anatoliy Kelchevskiy. The plot of land occupied by the old prison was too small to accommodate a modern prison. Because of that an adjoining plot of land previously occupied by a Lipka Tatar cemetery was bought for the price of 20 thousand roubles.

The new complex covered the entire block. It included a penal prison with cells for 421 inmates, a detention centre for 278 inmates, as well as several other buildings. Those included an office building, kitchen, bakery, baths, ice cellar and a laundry. In addition, there were family apartments for the warden, his four deputies and 37 officers, and 24 smaller flats for single officers. One of the most distinctive buildings in the complex was the Orthodox St. Nicholas Church, one of the finest Orthodox churches in Vilna. However, as most of the inhabitants of the Vilna Governorate were Catholics or Jews, a separate Catholic church and a small synagogue were also built into one of the prison blocks. The new prison had its own water supply and had its own sewage system. The complex was surrounded with a stone wall.

The prison complex was the most expensive building constructed in the region in the early 20th century. The cells were fully equipped, heated and ventilated, and constructed entirely of non-combustible materials (except for window frames and doors). The prison block containing the churches alone cost 504,000 roubles. The building of the detention centre cost 285,000 roubles, while the administrative building with offices and apartments for the staff cost approximately 180 thousand roubles. Despite its complexity, the project was finished in 1905, a full year ahead of schedule.

Location 
The prison is located in a prestigious area, next to the Seimas Palace and Martynas Mažvydas National Library of Lithuania. One of the best schools in Lithuania known for its mathematics program, School No.6, was located across the Lukiškiu street from the prison.

History of use

Second Polish Republic 
In the interwar Second Polish Republic, the prison was used by Polish authorities to hold numerous notable West Belarusian political prisoners, for example: writers Maksim Tank, Maksim Haretski, Michaś Mašara, Uladzislau Pauliukouski, teacher Barys Kit, musician and composer Ryhor Šyrma, ballet dancer Janka Chvorast. The largest group of prisoners during the interwar years were communists and socialists, and the Communist Party of Western Belorussia frequently attempted to hold protests against the prison, calling it a place of "fascist terror."

World War II 
Following the Soviet occupation of the Baltic states in 1940, the prison was equally used as a temporary holding detention for prisoners who were then deported to the Gulag. Menachem Begin, who later served as sixth Prime Minister of Israel, was notably held in the prison after his arrest in September 1940. In June 1941, during the German invasion, the NKVD shot prisoners at Lukiškės Prison (see NKVD prisoner massacres).

The prison became more notorious during the Nazi occupation of Lithuania, when it was used by the Gestapo and Lithuanian Saugumas as a holding cell for thousands of Jews from the Vilna Ghetto and Poles, picked up in łapankas (roundups) in reprisals for actions by the Polish resistance. The majority were taken to the outskirts of Vilnius and executed at Ponary (Paneriai).

When Soviets reoccupied the territory in 1944, the prison was returned to the NKVD who detained thousands of Polish activists and partisans of Armia Krajowa.

Post-Soviet era 
The prison was the site of Lithuania's last execution in 1995.

As of 2007, it housed approximately 1,000 prisoners and employed around 250 prison guards. Most prisoners there were under temporary arrest awaiting court decisions or transfers to other detention facilities, but there was also a permanent prison with about 180 inmates; about 80 of whom were serving life terms. After more than a century of continuous service, the prison suffered from overcrowding and was in need of improvements.

In 2009, the European Committee for the Prevention of Torture reported "several allegations from prisoners concerning physical ill-treatment inflicted by staff" and that conditions in the parts of the complex that had not been recently renovated had "deteriorated to the extent that they could be described as deplorable."

According to a 2014 plan, the prison was to be relocated to Pravieniškės by 2018. The prison was officially closed on 2 July 2019. After its closure, it became open to the public for tours.

Post-closure 
Followings the closure of the prison, the complex was turned into a cultural centre. In 2020, it was used as filming location for the fourth season of Stranger Things. Later that year, the Lithuanian government announced that part of the complex would be sold. In 2022, the Vilnius tourism agency announced that a Stranger Things-themed cell in the complex would be available to rent on Airbnb. This drew controversy from various groups who felt that it overlooked the prison's role in WWII.

Notable prisoners
 Francišak Alachnovič, Belarusian dramatist
 Menachem Begin, future Prime Minister of Israel
 Mykolas Biržiška, Lithuanian politician
 Mykolas Burokevičius, Lithuanian communist political leader
 Bertrand Cantat, French singer
 , Belarusian ballet dancer
 Boris Dekanidze, crime boss and convicted murderer, the last man executed in Lithuania
 Felix Dzerzhinsky, Russian statesman, revolutionary and founder of Cheka
 Mieczysław Gutkowski, Polish lawyer and economist
 Maksim Haretski, Belarusian writer
 Vladimiras Ivanovas, convicted murderer, executed in 1993, on the same day as Valentinas Laskys
 Romuald Jałbrzykowski, Polish Catholic priest and a bishop
 Barys Kit, Belarusian teacher, mathematician and scientist
 Marcelė Kubiliūtė, the only Lithuanian woman awarded all major Lithuanian orders
 Valentinas Laskys, serial killer, executed in 1993, on the same day as Vladimiras Ivanovas
 , Belarusian writer
 , Belarusian writer
 Maksim Tank, Belarusian writer
 Kazimierz Pelczar, Polish physicist and scientist, pioneer of oncology
 Kazimierz Pietkiewicz, Polish socialist and independence activist
 Barbara Skarga, Polish philosopher 
 , Belarusian musician and composer
 Leopold Tyrmand, Polish writer
 Antanas Varnelis, serial killer, executed in 1994
 Jonas Vileišis, Lithuanian publisher and diplomat
 Jacob Wygodzki, Polish-Lithuanian Jewish politician
 Tomasz Zan, Polish poet

References

External links

 
 The Belarusian song (beg. of 20th century) about Lukiškės Prison

1904 establishments in Lithuania
Government buildings completed in 1904
Buildings and structures in Vilnius
Prisons in Lithuania
Prisons in the Soviet Union
Holocaust locations in Lithuania
Mass murder in 1941
Soviet World War II crimes
Massacres committed by the Soviet Union